Stanley Eis (July 7, 1931 – January 25, 1991), known professionally as Stanley Brock, was an American film and television actor. He played Howie Hoffstedder on 78 episodes of the American daytime soap opera broadcast Days of Our Lives. He also played Ivan Bronski in the short-lived television sitcom He's the Mayor and Harvey Bilchik in the 1989 film UHF.

Brock guest-starred in numerous television programs, including One Day at a Time, Charlie's Angels, Happy Days, Knots Landing, Hill Street Blues, The A-Team, Quantum Leap and Highway to Heaven. He also appeared in several episodes of Barney Miller (as Bruno Binder), The Rockford Files and Night Court. Brock died in January 1991, aged 59, of a heart attack in Los Angeles.

Filmography

Film

Television

References

External links 

Rotten Tomatoes profile

1931 births
1991 deaths
People from Brooklyn
Male actors from New York City
American male television actors
American male film actors
American soap opera actors
American male soap opera actors
20th-century American male actors